Maxwell House is a brand of coffee.

Maxwell House may also refer to:

 Maxwell House (Stedman, North Carolina), a historic home listed on the National Register of Historic Places (NRHP)
 Maxwell House Hotel, Nashville, Tennessee

See also
 Maxwell House Haggadah a haggadah produced by the Maxwell House Company
 Maxwell House Show Boat radio show sponsored by the coffee brand
 The Printworks (Manchester), England (incorporating Thomson House alias Maxwell House)